Rocky Neck State Park is a public recreation area on Long Island Sound in the town of East Lyme, Connecticut, United States. The state park's  include a tidal river, a broad salt marsh, white sand beaches, rocky shores, and a large stone pavilion dating from the 1930s. It is managed by the Connecticut Department of Energy and Environmental Protection.

History
During the 19th century, various fertilizer operations occupied the site. The park traces its beginnings to 1931, when conservationists purchased the land and held it until the state legislature authorized state purchase. During the Great Depression, a 356-foot, timber-and-granite pavilion was constructed by federal relief workers.

Features
Pavilion
The Ellie Mitchell Pavilion is a Rustic-style building completed in 1936 by the Works Progress Administration. It is the largest Depression-era structure in the state.

Construction began in the early 1930s as part of an effort to ease crowding at Hammonasset State Park. Much of its timber and granite were drawn from local suppliers and quarries and from an abandoned fish fertilizer plant on the grounds. Supporting pillars were fashioned from trees cut from each of the state parks and forests. The pavilion was handed over to the state in October 1936 and opened as the Ellie Mitchell Pavilion. Visitors could purchase food, eat in the dining areas, and warm themselves by eight fireplaces during cooler months. In 1986, the pavilion and its surrounding  were listed on the National Register of Historic Places.

Footbridge
The park is crossed by the Northeast Corridor, Amtrak's main line from New York to Boston, on a right-of-way first chartered in 1848 by the New Haven and New London Railroad. A 1934 footbridge carries pedestrians over the tracks between the pavilion and its parking lot. The  arched steel bridge has been documented by the Historic American Engineering Record, which describes it as "an unusual surviving example of a railroad footbridge."

Access road
The park has its own exit (exit 72) on the Connecticut portion of Interstate 95. This exit is for the Rocky Neck connector, which is designated as the unsigned Connecticut Special Service Road 449.

Activities and amenities
The park offers picnicking, saltwater fishing, saltwater swimming, a campground with 160 sites, and interpretive programs. Hiking trails lead to a salt marsh, Baker's Cave, Tony's Nose, Shipyard, and other points of interest.

See also

List of bridges documented by the Historic American Engineering Record in Connecticut
National Register of Historic Places listings in New London County, Connecticut

References

External links

Rocky Neck State Park Connecticut Department of Energy and Environmental Protection
Rocky Neck State Park Map Connecticut Department of Energy and Environmental Protection

Aerial view ca. 1935	

East Lyme, Connecticut
State parks of Connecticut
Long Island Sound
Parks in New London County, Connecticut
Beaches of Connecticut
Historic American Engineering Record in Connecticut
National Register of Historic Places in New London County, Connecticut
Landforms of New London County, Connecticut
Protected areas established in 1931
1931 establishments in Connecticut
Campgrounds in Connecticut
Nature centers in Connecticut
Event venues on the National Register of Historic Places in Connecticut
Works Progress Administration in Connecticut